Thouria is a village and a former municipality in Messenia, Peloponnese, Greece. Since the 2011 local government reform it is part of the municipality Kalamata, of which it is a municipal unit. The municipal unit has an area of 76.922 km2. Its population in 2011 was 2,721. It takes its name from the ancient town of Thuria.

References

Populated places in Messenia